The Serbian Orthodox Eparchy of Düsseldorf and all of Germany, officially renamed in 2018, and formerly known as Serbian Orthodox Eparchy of Central Europe, is a Serbian Orthodox Church diocese in Germany. It has its headquarters in Düsseldorf, Germany.

History

First Serbian-Orthodox parishes in Germany, e.g. B. the Serbian-Orthodox parish in Hamburg and in Hanover, emerged in the years after the Second World War. Labor migration has brought tens of thousands of Serbs to Western European countries since the 1960s. The Eparchy of Western Europe was founded in 1969 to provide for their religious needs. It initially comprised all the states west of the Iron Curtain and, until 1973, also Australia. The Serbs in Germany were a particularly strong group, and so numerous other church communities and also a Monastery of Dormition of the Theotokos, Hildesheim, Lower Saxony, which was the bishopric seat from 1979, were established. On December 6, 1990, at an ordinary session of the Holy Synod of Bishops of the Serbian Orthodox Church, led by the then Serbian Patriarch, Pavle, two separate new eparchies were established from the Eparchy of Western Europe: the Eparchy of Britain-Scandinavia, based in Stockholm, Sweden, and the Eparchy of Central Europe based in Hildesheim-Himmelsthür, to which all other western European states belonged. On May 23, 1991, the protosingel and former professor at the seminary of Sremski Karlovci in Vojvodina, Konstantin (Đokić), was chosen and ordained as the first bishop of the eparchy. Over time, the eparchy experienced some territorial changes. In 1994 Italy was annexed to the Zagreb-Ljubljana Metropolitan Area, the Benelux countries, France and Spain joined the newly founded Eparchy of Western Europe based in Paris. In July 2011 Austria and Switzerland were removed from the eparchy; since then they have formed the Serbian Orthodox Diocese of Austria-Switzerland. In May 2014, Archimandrite Sergije (Karanović) was elected as new Serbian Orthodox Bishop of Central Europe. In December 2012, then-Bishop Konstantin (Đokić) was suspended as Bishop of the Eparchy and Serbian Patriarch Irinej took over administrative leadership of the Eparchy until May 23, 2014, by the Holy Synod of Bishops of the Serbian Orthodox Church Sergije (Karanović) to Bishop chosen by the eparchy In 2015, the Diocese was officially renamed to Serbian Orthodox Diocese of Frankfurt and all of Germany. From 2017 until Bishop Grigorije Durić took office, Andrej Ćilerdžić, Bishop of the Diocese of Austria-Switzerland, headed the Eparchy as Administrator. By decision of the Holy Synod of Bishops of the Serbian Orthodox Church at the ordinary session, which took place from April 29 to May 10, 2018, in Belgrade, the previous Bishop of the Eparchy of Zahumlje-Herzegovina-and-Coastland Grigorije (Durić) became the new Bishop of the Eparchy. 16. September 2018. the new Bishop Grigorije (Durić) was enthroned as the new bishop of Düsseldorf and All Germany (Serbian Orthodox Church) in the Saint Sava Cathedral, Düsseldorf, Germany. By the synod resolution of November of the same year, the Eparchy of Frankfurt and All Germany was renamed Eparchy of Düsseldorf and All Germany, with its seat in Düsseldorf. In 2019 the eparchy celebrated its 50th anniversary.

List of Orthodox Churches

 Hamburg
 Cologne
 Munich
 Augsburg
 Regensburg
 Wuppertal
 Kassel
 Villingen-Schwenningen
 Mannheim
 Wiesbaden
 Berlin
 Ulm
 Stuttgart
 Karlsruhe
 Nuremberg
 Osnabrück
 Einsiedelei St. Spyridon, Geilnau

Gallery

References

External links

 Serbian Orthodox Eparchy of Düsseldorf and all of Germany 
  
  
 Hierarchal Divine Liturgy in Frankfurt
 The Feast-day of Saint Nicholas celebrated in Nurnberg

Religious sees of the Serbian Orthodox Church
Serbian Orthodox Church in Germany
Serbian Orthodox Church in Austria
Serbian Orthodox Church in Switzerland